Her Husband's Affairs is a 1947 American romantic comedy film directed by S. Sylvan Simon and starring Lucille Ball and Franchot Tone.

Plot
Harebrained schemes keep interrupting the honeymoon plans of newlyweds Bill and Margaret Weldon. The schemes are his: Bill constantly backs an eccentric inventor who comes up with a magical hair-growing formula and one that turns flowers into stone. Circumstances conspire to make it appear that Bill has murdered the inventor, but in the courtroom he spends more time promoting his wild ideas than he does defending his life. Margaret's testimony saves her husband, after which he continues to demand that she quit meddling in his affairs.

Cast

Reception
The snippet-review for Blockbuster reads, "Pleasant comedy owes screwy bounce to Ball."

References

External links
 
 
 
 

1947 films
1947 romantic comedy films
American black-and-white films
American romantic comedy films
Columbia Pictures films
Films directed by S. Sylvan Simon
Films scored by George Duning
Films with screenplays by Ben Hecht
Films with screenplays by Charles Lederer
1940s American films